Parliamentary elections were held in Bulgaria on 13 October 1991. They were the first elections held under the country's first post-communist constitution, which had been promulgated three months earlier.

The result was a victory for the Union of Democratic Forces (SDS), which won 110 of the 240 seats. The Bulgarian Socialist Party, the successor to the Communist Party, finished a close second with 106 seats. Voter turnout was 83.9%. Following the election, SDS leader Philip Dimitrov became Prime Minister, heading a coalition of the SDS and the Movement for Rights and Freedoms.

Results

References

Bulgaria
Parliamentary
1991 in Bulgaria
Parliamentary elections in Bulgaria
Bulgaria